The list of shipwrecks in June 1874 includes ships sunk, foundered, grounded, or otherwise lost during June 1874.

1 June

2 June

3 June

4 June

5 June

6 June

7 June

8 June

9 June

10 June

11 June

12 June

15 June

16 June

17 June

18 June

19 June

20 June

24 June

25 June

29 June

30 June

Unknown date

References

Bibliography
 Gaines, W. Craig, Encyclopedia of Civil War shipwrecks, Louisiana State University Press, 2008, .ISBN
Ingram, C. W. N., and Wheatley, P. O., (1936) Shipwrecks: New Zealand disasters 1795–1936. Dunedin, NZ: Dunedin Book Publishing Association.

1874-06
Maritime incidents in June 1874